Tillandsia utriculata, commonly known as the spreading airplant or the giant airplant, is a species of bromeliad that is native to Florida and Georgia in the United States, the Caribbean, southern and eastern Mexico (Tamaulipas, Veracruz, Oaxaca, the Yucatán Peninsula), Central America, and Venezuela.

Two varieties are recognized:

Tillandsia utriculata subsp. pringlei (S.Watson) C.S.Gardner - eastern Mexico
Tillandsia utriculata subsp. utriculata - most of species range

Florida populations of Tillandsia utriculata are highly susceptible to attack by the invasive weevil Metamasius callizona, and have been devastated virtually throughout their range. Tillandsia utriculata holds more impounded water in its leaf axils, known as its tank, (up to a liter) than does any other Florida bromeliad. It is a major host of many species of aquatic invertebrates. With T, utriculata on a steady decline a loss of habit is occurring for many of these animal species.

References

External links

utriculata
Plants described in 1753
Taxa named by Carl Linnaeus
Flora of the Southeastern United States
Flora of the Caribbean
Flora of Central America
Flora of Venezuela
Flora of Mexico
Flora without expected TNC conservation status